Adriano Luís Spadoto (born 19 February 1977 in Piracicaba, São Paulo) is a former Brazilian football player.

Career
He was signed by Swiss team FC Thun along with Adriano Pimenta in summer 2005. He went to Europe through Josias Lacour, a Fifa Agent from Curitiba.

He signed a 6-month contract with Paranavaí in January 2007. He then transferred to Fortaleza.

In January 2008, he signed a contract until the end of Campeonato Paulista for Mirassol.

He began his career playing for Guarani FC (Campinas-SP). After that, he was transferred to Esporte Clube Cruzeiro (Belo Horizonte-MG) where he became a professional,
In January 1999 he was negotiated with Atlético Clube de Paranavai (Paraná State.
In May 2000 he was transferred to J. Malucelli and won João Havelange Cup for Green Group (equivalent to third Division). 
In 2003 he was negotiated with Figueirense FC (Florianópolis-SC).
In 2004 he played for Santa Cruz FC (Recife-PE).
In 2005 he played for aSport Clube Recife (Recife-PE) and after that he was transferred to Guarani FC and was transferred to Europe.

External links

  Brazilian FA Database

1977 births
Living people
People from Piracicaba
Brazilian footballers
Brazilian expatriate footballers
Santa Cruz Futebol Clube players
Figueirense FC players
Guarani FC players
FC Thun players
Fortaleza Esporte Clube players
Mirassol Futebol Clube players
Swiss Super League players
Ukrainian Premier League players
Expatriate footballers in Switzerland
Expatriate footballers in Ukraine
Brazilian expatriate sportspeople in Ukraine
Association football defenders
Footballers from São Paulo (state)